Chaudhry Muhammad Hanif Jutt is a Pakistani politician who was a Member of the Provincial Assembly of the Punjab, from May 2013 to May 2018.

Early life and education
He was born on 9 November 1963 in Chichawatni.

He graduated in 1986 from University of the Punjab.

Political career
He was elected to the Provincial Assembly of the Punjab as a candidate of Pakistan Muslim League (Nawaz) from Constituency PP-226 (Sahiwal-VII) in 2013 Pakistani general election.

References

Living people
Punjab MPAs 2013–2018
1963 births
People from Chichawatni
University of the Punjab alumni
Pakistan Muslim League (N) politicians